Industrialny City District may refer to:

Industrialny City District, Russia, several city districts in Russia
Industrialnyi District, Dnipro, Ukraine
Industrialnyi District, Kharkiv, Ukraine

District name disambiguation pages